Elsie  and Mathilde Wolff Van Sandau (died in 1926, aged 83) were British suffragette sisters: Elsie was arrested for smashing shop windows, went on hunger strike and was awarded the Women's Social and Political Union Hunger Strike Medal 'for Valour'. Mathilde was a musician and suffragette, and was imprisoned twice, also for smashing windows, and was a founder of London's women's chess club and an active vegetarian.

Life and suffrage activism 
Elsie and sister Mathilde Wolff Van Sandau (also known as Matilda) were the granddaughters of Dr. E. Schwabe, private chaplain to the Duchess of Kent.  Mathilde was a pianist, a music teacher and became a founder member of the London Ladies Chess Club, and became a leader in vegetarian groups.

The Wolff Van Sandau sisters joined the militant Women's Social and Political Union protesting on women's right to vote. They were among the three hundred women brutally attacked by police and men in the crowd for about six hours, on what is known as 'Black Friday' on 18 November 1910, when the women's deputation approached the House of Commons but were prevented from entering. Over 100 women were arrested, including Miss Wolff de Sandau, as noted in the following day's Times newspaper but all women were eventually released, without charge.

Elsie's activism included joining the two hundred women, organised on 1st and 4 March 1912, to carry out what was a second wave of window smashing protests in Covent Garden, London. This took place at the same time as the Parliament was debating a Conciliation Bill (for some women to get the right to vote, which was not passed).  Meanwhile, Mathilde, with Katie Mills, was arrested for smashing the windows of the Howick Place Post Office: postal services were seen by suffragettes as a 'symbol of oppressive male government'.

Hunger strike 

Elsie Van Sandau was sent to prison and immediately went on hunger strike. Suffragettes on hunger strike were frequently force-fed and objected to this 'treatment' as well as being treated as criminals not as 'political' prisoners.  A roll-call of those being released, excluding Patricia Woodlock, who got a longer sentence was created (probably for the WSPU welcome event). In recognition of Elsie Van Sandau's suffering in prison, the WSPU awarded her a Hunger Strike Medal 'for Valour' designed by Christabel Pankhurst, with the ribbon in the colours of the women's suffrage movement – green, white and purple, representing 'hope, purity and dignity' – and a bar dated 4 March 1912.

The presentation box was inscribedELSIE WOLFF VAN SANDAU – BY THE WOMEN'S SOCIAL & POLITICAL UNION IN RECOGNITION OF A GALLANT ACTION, WHEREBY THROUGH ENDURANCE TO THE LAST EXTREMITY OF HUNGER AND HARDSHIP, A GREAT PRINCIPLE OF POLITICAL JUSTICE WAS VINDICATED.The National Archive record lists suffragette prisoners, including Elsie and Mathilde Wolff Van Sandau, who were officially pardoned when the WSPU discontinued militancy at the start of World War One.

First women's chess club 
In 1895, Mathilde had set up one of the first women's chess clubs, being elected as the first vice-president of the London Ladies' Chess Club, which initially had to compete against men's clubs.  She hosted chess committee meetings at her home 49 Elgin Crescent. Mathilde also advertised her music teaching and performances and availability for a more formal school engagement in the chess club magazine.

Women leading in vegetarian societies 
In 1897, Mathilde, a confirmed vegetarian, was among those who performed to an audience of 700, at the 4th International Vegetarian Congress of the International Vegetarian Union in London. Later in her life, Mathilde Wolff van Sandau was chosen to be the honorary secretary of Brighton and Hove Vegetarian Society.
 
In 1926, Matilda was lodging in Putney. She died in a local nursing home on 29 August 1926 aged 83 and was buried in Putney Vale Cemetery as Matilda Wolff.

Hunger Strike Medal auctioned 
Elsie's Hunger Strike medal came to light in a drawer in a home in East Sheen, London a hundred years later, and it was auctioned in Derbyshire in June 2019.  It was sold privately for £12,500 and the valuer at Hansons Auctioneers, Helen Smith, said of Elsie's action:"Her decision to go on hunger strike shows she was willing to die for her cause. Would today’s generation of women have been so selfless? We’re very proud to sell this medal, which is worthy of a museum or an important suffragette collection."The auctioneer Isabel Murtough remarked:"I hope this find reminds people of the sacrifices Miss Wolff Van Sandau and her fellow suffragettes made a century ago to help women gain rights many of us now take for granted."

References 

1895 in chess
British vegetarianism activists
English chess players
English female chess players
English suffragettes
Hunger Strike Medal recipients
Hunger strikers
Women's Social and Political Union